Anna Katharina Schaffelhuber (born 26 January 1993) is a German para-alpine skier. At the 2014 Winter Paralympics she won five gold medals, becoming only the second athlete to sweep the alpine skiing events.

Early life
Schaffelhuber was born in Regensburg, Bavaria, Germany. She was born with an incomplete spinal cord and as a result has paraplegia and uses a wheelchair. She began monoskiing at age five and at age fourteen received a scholarship to join a national junior skiing programme.

Career
Schaffelhuber competes in the LW10 para-alpine skiing classification using a sitting mono-ski and outriggers.

She was selected for the German team at the 2010 Winter Paralympics held in Vancouver, British Columbia, Canada where she competed in four events. She won the bronze medal in the super-G finishing behind Claudia Lösch of Austria and American Alana Nichols in a time of 1 minute 38.25 seconds. She also finished fourth in two events, the super combined and the slalom, and seventh in the giant slalom. During the closing ceremony of the Games she carried the German flag.

She skied at the 2011 IPC Alpine Skiing World Championships, held in Sestriere, Italy. She won the three gold medals, in the sitting women's super-combined, slalom and giant slalom, a silver in the team event, as well as finishing fourth in both the downhill and super-G.

At the 2013 IPC Alpine Skiing World Championships held in La Molina, Spain, she successfully defended her title in the slalom, winning the gold medal in a time of 2 minutes 26.18 seconds. She won four other medals; silver medals in the giant slalom and super-G; and bronze medals in the super combined and downhill.

She competed in her second Paralympics at the 2014 Winter Games in Sochi, Russia. She claimed her first Paralympic gold medal by winning the sitting downhill in a time of 1 minute 35.55 seconds. She won a second gold medal in the super-G, finishing first in a time of 1 minute 29.11 seconds. Competing in the slalom she was initially disqualified for not having her outriggers in a stationary position at the start of her first run and compatriot Anna-Lena Forster was identified as the gold medal winner in press releases. Following an appeal Schaffelhuber was reinstated and awarded her third gold medal of the Games with Forster winning the silver medal. Schaffelhuber won a fourth gold medal in the combined, with Forster again taking silver as the two German skiers were the only athletes to complete the race. She won her fifth gold medal, completing a clean sweep in the sitting events, by winning the giant slalom in a combined time of 2 minutes 51.26 seconds. She became the second athlete to sweep the alpine skiing events after Lauren Woolstencroft in 2010. For her performance at the Games, Schaffelhuber was awarded Best Female at the Paralympic Sports Awards.

Awards
In November 2010 Schaffelhuber was voted the International Paralympic Committee's athlete of the month, taking 45% of the public vote. In November 2011 she was named Germany's Disabled Athlete of the Year and she was the German National Paralympic Committee's 2013 Female Disabled Athlete of Year.

References

External links 

 
 

1993 births
Alpine skiers at the 2010 Winter Paralympics
Alpine skiers at the 2014 Winter Paralympics
Alpine skiers at the 2018 Winter Paralympics
German female alpine skiers
Living people
Medalists at the 2010 Winter Paralympics
Medalists at the 2014 Winter Paralympics
Medalists at the 2018 Winter Paralympics
Paralympic alpine skiers of Germany
Paralympic bronze medalists for Germany
Paralympic gold medalists for Germany
Paralympic silver medalists for Germany
Sportspeople from Regensburg
People with paraplegia
Paralympic Sport Awards — Best Female winners
Paralympic medalists in alpine skiing
21st-century German women